Jinbeisaurus (meaning "northern Shanxi Province lizard" after Shanxi Province in China) is a genus of tyrannosauroid dinosaur from the Upper Cretaceous Huiquanpu Formation from Shanxi Province in China. The type and only species is Jinbeisaurus wangi. It is the first non-avian theropod known from Shanxi. Analysis of the specimen indicates that Jinbeisaurus is more derived than related tyrannosauroids such as Xiongguanlong and phylogenetically more advanced than Suskityrannus, to which it has been compared.

Jinbeisaurus was originally seen as a juvenile specimen of Tarbosaurus.

Description 
It is known from holotype specimen  SMG V0003, including a "pair of maxillae (nearly complete right bone and incomplete left bone) and an incomplete right dentary, associated with two cervical centra, five dorsal centra, and an incomplete right pubis." It can be distinguished from other tyrannosaurs by "a broad interfenestral strut, a deep fossa on the broad base of the septum between the promaxillary recess and maxillary antrum, a low position of the dorsal row of dentary foramina, a similar number of denticles per unit length on both the mesial and distal carinae of the upper and lower teeth, and an acute angle of about 70 degrees between the posterior process of the foot and the shaft of the pubis."

See also

 Timeline of tyrannosaur research

References 

Tyrannosaurs
Late Cretaceous dinosaurs of Asia
Cretaceous China
Fossil taxa described in 2019